Stephanie Edwards may refer to:

 Stephanie Edwards (television personality) (born 1943), longtime co-host of the Tournament of Roses Parade
 Stephanie Edwards (singer) (born 1987), American singer, contestant on TV show American Idol
 Sparkle (singer) (born Stephanie Edwards, born 1975), American singer
 Stephanie Edwards (Grey's Anatomy), a fictional character from the medical drama television series Grey's Anatomy